The Nakako are an Aboriginal Australian people of Western and Southern Australia.

Country
Norman Tindale estimated the Nakako territorial domains to stretch , south and southwest of the Blackstone Ranges. Tindale's estimates, particularly for the peoples of the Western desert, are not considered to be accurate. Tindale also states that the Nanako were present at Bell Rock Range.

History of contact
The Nakako were one of the last tribes to come within the purview of white explorers. Their first encounter with white explorers occurred sometime around 1953 when patrol officer Walter MacDougall came across them at Woomera. After this initial encounter, they vanished, until they were rediscovered by white settlers in 1961.

Alternative names
 Nakaku, Nangako.
 Nangakopitja. (Pitjantjatjara exonym).
 Wanudjara.

References

Aboriginal peoples of Western Australia